Başbakanlık Kupası (Prime Minister's Cup) is the tournament of the Cyprus Turkish Football Federation, Turkish Republic of Northern Cyprus.

Winners
1981 : Iskele Gençler Birligi  3-1 Vadili
1982 : Ortaköy                 3-2 Agirdag
1983 : Yenicami                3-0 Inonu
1984 : Binatli                 6-5 Beyarmudu            [after pen]
1985 : Alsancak Yesilova       5-4 Ergazi               [after pen]
1986 : Agirdag                 5-3 Dogan Türk Birligi   [after pen]
1987 : Pile                    3-1 Yalova 
1988 : Akincilar               2-0 Vadili 
1989 : Dogan Türk Birligi      1-0 Magusa Türk Gücü 
1990 : Dogan Türk Birligi      1-0 Çetinkaya Türk
1991 : Baf Ülkü Yurdu          5-3 Küçük Kaymakli
1992 : Gönyeli                 4-2 Binatli              [after pen]
1993 : Dogan Türk Birligi      3-1 Gençlik Gücü
1994 : Gönyeli                 4-1 Gaziveren
1995 : Yalova                  3-0 Girne Halk Evi 
1996 : Akincilar               2-1 Gönyeli
1997 : Gönyeli                15-2 Dumlupinar
1998 : Küçük Kaymakli        2-1 Çetinkaya Türk
1999 : Gönyeli                 4-0 Küçük Kaymakli
2000
2001 : Küçük Kaymakli          6-1 Esentepe

References

External links
Cypriot Cup details at KTFF.org

Football competitions in Northern Cyprus